Schlegel is a village and a former municipality in the district Saale-Orla-Kreis, in Thuringia, Germany. Since 1 January 2019, it is part of the municipality Rosenthal am Rennsteig. Olympian Harry Köcher was born here.

References

Former municipalities in Thuringia
Saale-Orla-Kreis